The following is a list of Arizona Wildcats softball seasons. The University of Arizona is a member of the Pac-12 Conference of the NCAA Division I.  The Wildcats are eight time Women's College World Series champions, and are regarded as one of the top programs in college softball after winning eight championships in seventeen seasons, including a run of sixteen consecutive WCWS appearances.  Arizona has also appeared in the final event 27 times - 4 under the AIAW and 23 under the NCAA. The team played its first season in 1974.

References

Arizona
Arizona Wildcats softball